Miro Longyka (22 March 1913 – 20 February 2008) was a Slovenian gymnast. He competed in eight events at the 1948 Summer Olympics.

References

External links
 

1913 births
2008 deaths
Slovenian male artistic gymnasts
Olympic gymnasts of Yugoslavia
Gymnasts at the 1948 Summer Olympics
Sportspeople from Ljubljana